The Royal Greenhouses of Laeken are a vast complex of monumental heated greenhouses in the park of the Royal Palace of Laeken (northern part of the City of Brussels), Belgium. The historic complex contains tropical, subtropical and cold greenhouses.

The greenhouses were designed and built by Alphonse Balat on behalf of King Leopold II. They are now part of the Royal Domain and the royal private gardens belonging to the Belgian Royal Family, and are accessible to the public only a few days a year. This site is served by Stuyvenbergh metro station on line 6 of the Brussels Metro.

History

Inception and construction
The original gardens of the Royal Palace of Laeken date back to the 18th century, but King Leopold II drastically changed their appearance. The king, having visited the Crystal Palace at the Great Exhibition of 1851 in London, wanted such a progressive building in his palace's garden, which would combine his love for plants with multifunctional spaces that could also be used as a banquet, theatre and dining halls. He called on the botanist Jean Linden for this project, but his design was too unambitious. He then commissioned his architect Alphonse Balat. Balat's plans surpassed all that had been achieved at the time, even the Palm house in London's Kew Gardens (1844–1848) and Carl Bouché's botanical garden in Berlin-Schöneberg. The realisation came about in close consultation between Balat and the king, following frequent discussions, correspondence and preliminary designs.

The first construction phase took place between 1874 and 1893, ending with the completion of the so-called Iron Church, a domed greenhouse, which would originally serve as the royal chapel. The inauguration took place in 1880, but the complex was also expanded afterwards. During that period, the king was preparing his Congo Free State, a private colony which was founded in 1885. The greenhouses were intended as a symbol of the king's colonial power: plants from Central Africa were said to illustrate that power. In particular, the Congo Greenhouse and the Embarcadère Greenhouse were built in 1886–1888 from this perspective. A third zone was constructed from 1892 to 1905. For this, after Balat's death, Leopold called upon the architects Henri Maquet and Charles Girault. The octagonal Palm Pavilion was furnished as a bedroom and connected to the palace by a subterranean corridor where Leopold received his mistresses. After the death of the king, in 1909, the greenhouses were preserved, but the Iron Church was converted into a private royal bathing house.

Present-day

The Winter Garden at the palace in Laeken still serves as the setting for royal receptions. Every year in the spring, the greenhouses are partially opened to the public for twenty days at the request of Leopold II. This tradition has been carried on by all monarchs who reigned after him. The greenhouses are also sometimes used today for contemporary art exhibits and displays, such as Alexandre Dang's The Dancing Solar Forget-Me-Not for the International Day of Missing Children (in cooperation with Child Focus) in 2010.

Description
The Royal Greenhouses of Laeken are among the major monuments of the 19th century in Belgium. They were built entirely in metal and glass, which represented a spectacular innovation for the time (as was the Crystal Palace in London). This complex takes on the appearance of a glass city set in a hilly landscape. It is characterised by monumental pavilions, glass domes, as well as wide galleries that run through the land like covered streets. Approximately  of fuel oil are needed each year to heat the buildings.

Winter Garden
The start and end points of the trusses rest on the ground so that the greenhouse presents the image of a glass dome supported by flying buttresses. Its enormous dimensions made it possible to plant Congolese palm trees in the rotunda. This Winter Garden, the main building of the complex, was also of great importance for the development of cast-iron architecture.

Other greenhouses
Between 1885 and 1887, Balat designed the Palm Greenhouse, the Congo Greenhouse, the Diana Greenhouse, and the Embarcadère Greenhouse. The latter consists of two parallel compartments under a barrel vault, the second of which contains a dome supported by iron Corinthian columns. It is decorated with Chinese vases and two statues by the sculptor Charles Van der Stappen (The Dawn and The Evening). Finally, in 1893, the Iron Church was added, a neo-Byzantine ensemble surrounded by wreath chapels, the dome of which is supported by twenty columns of Scottish granite. This greenhouse is therefore also officially called the Chapel Greenhouse.

Royal Botanic Collection
Famous is the Royal Botanic Collection, with old plants from Africa and various species of flowers which are cultivated inside the royal greenhouses for use at court. Though the current collection has lost many cultivars since the death of Leopold II, the collection is still famous. In 1909, there were 314 species of camellias in the royal collection, with more than 1000 plants. Today, only 305 remain. The camellias are the world's largest and oldest collection in a greenhouse. The orange tree collection of Leopold II was renowned with 130 trees aged 200 to 300 years, and one even 400 years old. In the 1970s, only 45 trees were still alive.

Visit

The royal complex can only be visited each year during a two-week period in April–May, when most flowers are in full bloom. It is the opportunity to discover one of the most remarkable monuments of Belgian heritage and to admire the collections of exotic plants and flowers, some of which have been brought back from expeditions to the Congo for Leopold II.

Other times, the greenhouses are visited by heads of state during official visits. Famous visitors have included:
 Archduke Rudolf was engaged in the new Winter Garden (1880).
 Laura Bush, First Lady of the United States (2001)
 Melania Trump, First Lady of the United States (2017)

Gallery

Exterior

Interior

See also
 List of parks and gardens in Brussels
 Royal Trust

References

Notes

Further reading
 Karin Borghouts, Irene Smets, Baudouin d'Hoore, Les Serres royales de Laeken (in French), BAI, 2019, 160 p. 
 Edgard Goedleven, Les Serres royales de Laeken (in French), Brussels, Duculot, Inbel, 1988
 Edgard Goedleven, Les Serres royales de Laeken (in French), Brussels, Racine & SFI, 1997
 Piet Lombaerde et Ronny Gobyn, Léopold II Roi-Bâtisseur (in French), Ghent, Pandora, 1995
 Liane Ranieri, Léopold II urbaniste (in French), Brussels, Hayez, 1973
 Irène Smets, Les Serres royales de Laeken (in French), Ghent, Ludion, 2001
 Emiel Vandewoude, Jos. Vandenbreeden, Paul Van Gorp, Les Serres royales à Laeken (in French), Brussels, Donation Royale, 1981
 Emiel Vandewoude, De bouw van de Wintertuin te Laken, 1874-1876, een initiatief van Leopold II (in Dutch), Brussels, Album Carlos Wyffels, 1987

External links

 Official website
 The Royal Greenhouses of Laeken on BALaT - Belgian Art Links and Tools (KIK-IRPA, Brussels)

Infrastructure completed in 1895
Buildings and structures in Brussels
Palaces in Belgium
Royal residences in Belgium
Tourist attractions in Brussels
Greenhouses
Gardens in Belgium
Leopold II of Belgium